Heron Crespo da Silva (born 17 August 2000), simply known as Heron, is a Brazilian footballer who plays as a centre-back for Goiás.

Club career
Born Rio de Janeiro, Heron made his senior debut for Osvaldo Cruz on 30 April 2017, starting in a 3–0 Campeonato Paulista Segunda Divisão home win against Grêmio Prudente; aged 16, he became the youngest player to appear for the club. On 16 February 2018, he moved to Goiás and subsequently returned to the youth setup.

Heron made his first team debut for the Esmeraldino on 14 August 2019, starting in a 0–0 away draw against Brasiliense for the year's Copa Verde. Definitely promoted to the main squad for the 2020 season, he made his Série A debut on 12 August of that year by starting in a 1–2 away loss against Athletico Paranaense.

On 21 August 2021, Heron joined Danish Superliga club Vejle Boldklub on loan. On 21 June 2022, he moved to Sheriff Tiraspol also in a temporary deal.

Career statistics

References

External links
Goiás profile 

2000 births
Living people
Footballers from Rio de Janeiro (city)
Brazilian footballers
Brazilian expatriate footballers
Association football defenders
Campeonato Brasileiro Série A players
Moldovan Super Liga players
Danish Superliga players
Goiás Esporte Clube players
Vejle Boldklub players
FC Sheriff Tiraspol players
Brazilian expatriate sportspeople in Denmark
Brazilian expatriate sportspeople in Moldova
Expatriate men's footballers in Denmark
Expatriate footballers in Moldova